Abacetus pseudangolanus is a species of ground beetle in the subfamily Pterostichinae. It was described by Straneo in 1952.

References

pseudangolanus
Beetles described in 1952